Following the collapse of Roman and later Lombard authority in southern Italy, a group of semi-independent principalities evolved between the 8th and 11th centuries:
Principality of Benevento, a former Lombard duchy, independent from 774
Principality of Salerno, split off from Benevento in 851
Principality of Capua, split off from Benevento in 981
Duchy of Naples, a former Byzantine province, a hereditary principality from 840
Duchy of Gaeta, its ruler took the title Duke in 933
Duchy of Amalfi, its ruler took the title Duke in 958
Duchy of Sorrento, usually under the authority of Amalfi
Emirate of Bari, an Arab state, founded in 847, conquered in 871
Emirate of Sicily, independent from 965 
County of Aversa, a Norman fief of Naples from 1030, conquered Capua in 1058
County of Sicily, the Norman conquest began in 1071, and was finished in 1091; the conquest of Malta was finished in 1127
Duchy of Apulia and Calabria, the supreme Norman authority on the peninsula from 1047

Eventually, all of these principalities were united under Norman rule and merged into the Kingdom of Sicily, founded in 1130

Former principalities
 
Lists of former countries
Italy history-related lists
Italy geography-related lists